Triple zero, Triple Zero, Zero Zero Zero, Triple 0, Triple-0, 000, or 0-0-0 may refer to:

 000 (emergency telephone number), the Australian emergency telephone number
 "Triple Zero", a song by AFI from Shut Your Mouth and Open Your Eyes
 Thousands (the fourth column of magnitude in the decimal system)
 0-0-0, a Star Wars droid character
 Star Wars Republic Commando: Triple Zero, the second novel in the Star Wars Republic Commando series
 Queen-side castling in chess notation
 Coordinate origin for a triple-coordinate system
 Zero Zero Zero, an album by singer Sam Phillips
 MissingNo., a glitch Pokémon with the Pokedex number #000

See also
 OOO (disambiguation) (triple letter 'O')
 Zero point (disambiguation)
 Point of origin (disambiguation)
 
 ZeroZeroZero (disambiguation)